Sri Lanka currently has over  of designated expressways serving the southern and central parts of the country. The second stage of the Southern Expressway opened in 2014 and extends to Matara. The newest expressway is the Port Access Elevated Highway running from New Kelani Bridge, Colombo to Athurugiriya, It is estimated to be finished in 2025. Pedestrians, bicycles, motorcycles, three wheelers and tractors are not permitted to enter the expressways.

ITS (Intelligent Transportation System) systems are being installed presently. ETC Electronic Toll Collection systems are being installed on the Southern Expressway while the Colombo-Katunayeke Expressway system is functional.

Expressways

{| class="wikitable sortable plainrowheaders"
|- 
! scope="col" | Number
! scope="col" | Name
! scope="col" | Length (km)
! scope="col" | Length (mi)
! scope="col" class=unsortable | Northern end
! scope="col" class=unsortable | Southern end
! scope="col" | Completed
! scope="col" class=unsortable | Notes
|-
! scope="row" |  E01
| Southern Expressway
| 
| Kadawatha, Colombo
| Mattala
| 2020
| Kottawa–Galle in 2011; Galle-Matara in 2014; Matara-Hambantota in 2020. 
|-
! scope="row" |  E02
| Outer Circular Expressway
| 
| Kerawalapitiya   
| Kottawa, Colombo
| 2019
| Kottawa–Kaduwela in 2014; Kaduwela–Kadawatha in 2015; Kadawatha-Kerawalapitiya in 2019  
|-
! scope="row" |  E03
| Colombo-Katunayake Expressway
| 
| Bandaranaike International Airport
|New Kelani Bridge, Colombo
| 2013
|  extension to Colombo Port City is under construction and is expected to be completed in 2022. New interchanges will be added at Ingurukade and Orugodawatta.
|-
! scope="row" data-sort-value="E04A" |  E04
| Central Expressway (Section II)
| 
| Kurunegala
| Mirigama
| 2022
| Partial project completion in 2022
|- bgcolor=#ffdead
! scope="row" data-sort-value="E04B" |  E04
| Central Expressway (Section I, III & IV)
| 
| Dambulla 
| Kadawatha 
| —
|Under construction. Stage 2 was opened in early 2022. Project completion up to Kandy in 2024
|-
! scope="row" |  E06
| Magampura Expressway
| 
|  Andarawewa 
|  Hambantota 
| 2019
| Completed in 2019
|- bgcolor=#ffdead
! scope="row" |  E09
| Port Access Elevated Highway 
| 
| New Kelani Bridge, Colombo 
| Port city
| —
|Under construction. Expected completion in 2022
|- bgcolor=#ffdead
! scope="row" data-sort-value="E10" |
| Ruwanpura Expressway
| 
|  Kahathuduwa 
|  Pelmadulla 
| —
| Under construction.  Expected completion in 2023
|- bgcolor=#ffdead
! scope="row" data-sort-value="E11" |
| NKB-Athurugiriya Elevated Highway
| 
|New Kelani Bridge, Colombo
|  Athurugiriya 
| —
| Under construction. Expected completion in 2025

Gallery

Southern Expressway (E01)

Katunayake (E03)

See also

 Transport in Sri Lanka

References

External links

 E
Sri Lanka
Expressways